The following is a list of Australian radio station callsigns beginning with the number 8, indicating radio stations in the Northern Territory.

Notes

Defunct Callsigns

 
Radio station callsigns, Northern Territory
Radio station callsigns
Lists of radio stations in Australia